This page details Blackpool Football Club's all-time records.

Club records

Results
Largest victory: 10–0 (v. Lanerossi Vicenza, Anglo-Italian Cup on 10 June 1972)
Largest defeat: 1–10 (v. Small Heath, Division Two, on 2 March 1901 and v. Huddersfield Town, Division One, on 13 December 1930)
Consecutive victories: 12 (between 31 March 2007 and 14 August 2007)
Consecutive defeats: 8 (between 26 November 1898 and 7 January 1899 and between 28 November 1964 and 16 January 1965)

League finishing positions

Highest: 2nd in Division One (1956)
Lowest: 21st in Division Four (1983)

Transfer fees
Largest transfer fee paid: £1,250,000 (DJ Campbell, to Leicester City, 2010)
Largest transfer fee received: £6,750,000 (Charlie Adam, from Liverpool, 2011)

Record transfer-fee progression

Paid

Received

Individual records

Players
Most Football League appearances: Jimmy Armfield (569; between 27 December 1954 and 1 May 1971)
Most consecutive League appearances: Georgie Mee (195; between 25 December 1920 and 12 September 1925)
Most goals in total: Jimmy Hampson (252; between 15 October 1927 and 8 January 1938)
Most Football League goals: Jimmy Hampson (248)
Most League goals in one season: Jimmy Hampson (45; in 1929–30)
Most goals in one game: 5 (Jimmy Hampson; v. Reading on 10 November 1928 and Jimmy McIntosh; v. Preston North End on 1 May 1948)
Fastest goal: 11 seconds (Bill Slater; v. Stoke City on 10 December 1949 and James Quinn; v. Bristol City on 12 August 1995
Most capped player: Jimmy Armfield (43; for England)

Managers
Longest-serving manager: Joe Smith (22 years, 9 months; from 1 August 1935 to 30 April 1958)

Personal honours

Ballon d'Or
The following players have won the Ballon d'Or while playing for Blackpool:
Stanley Matthews – 1956

FWA Footballer of the Year
The following players have won the FWA Footballer of the Year award while playing for Blackpool:
Stanley Matthews – 1947–48
Harry Johnston – 1950–51

Attendances
Largest attendance – Pre-2002: 38,098; v. Wolverhampton Wanderers on 17 September 1955.
Largest attendance – 2002 onwards: 16,116 (99.48% of capacity; v. Manchester City on 17 October 2010)

Home gate receipts
Highest: £72,949 (v. Tottenham Hotspur, FA Cup Third Round, 5 January 1991)

References

Records and Statistics
Blackpool